Stella Blandy (née Boué; 24 December 1836 - 18 April 1925) was a French writer and a committed feminist. A contributor to the literary journals Revue contemporaine and Revue des deux mondes, she wrote novels and essays, and also translated English and Italian works into French. Blandy died in 1925.

Biography
Françoise-Stella Boué was born 24 December 1836, in the small town of Montesquieu-Volvestre. The family was wealthy and at the time ran the town hall. She was attracted to writing early on in life. Following an excellent education, she immediately continued her studies abroad in England. While there, she married Francis Blandy with whom she had four children; two, Frank and Jeanne, survived early childhood. Her husband died in 1878. 

On her return to France, she began publishing her works, enjoying some success. Her novels, with strong regional appeal, were written principally for younger readers. While in Paris, she developed her feminist writing as she established friendships with George Sand and André Léo. In the late 1860s, she became active in the growing feminist movement, contributing to the journal Le Droit des femmes alongside Léon Richer, Maria Deraismes and Hubertine Auclert.

Her publishers included Hetzel, Firmin Didot, Delagrave, Hachette and Armand Colin. Around March 1875, together with Henriette Caroste, Anna Houry, Auclert, Deraismes, and her sister Anna Féresse-Deraismes, Blandy co-signed a letter asking Victor Hugo to support their feminist views.

Blandy collaborated with Revue contemporaine and Revue des deux mondes. She also translated English and Italian works. Among others, Blandy is remembered for her adaptation of Mayne Reid's novel, L’Habitation au désert, under the title Les Robinsons de terre ferme. Her novel La Teppe aux merles, published in 1890, is reminiscent of Alain-Fournier's hero, Le Grand Meaulnes. Stella Blandy died at the age of 88 in the town where she was born.

Complete works

 1864, Une Noce dans un Village Mâconnais 
 1867, La Dernière Chanson, Scène du Mâconnais 
 1869, Revanche de femme
 1869, L'Oncle Philibert
 1873, Les Indiscrétions du Princes Svanine. Un Musulman, s'il vous plaît. Le Bruderschaft. Sept pour un. L’Émeraude, 1873
 1875, Bénédicte 
 1877, Le Petit Roi
 1878, Les Robinsons de Terre Ferme (adaptation of L'Habitation au désert by Mayne Reid) 
 1880, Le Procès de l'absent
 1881, La Dette de Zeéna, 
 1881, Six pence, conte de Noël
 1881, Sous le Guy (novel)
 1882, La Benjamine
 1882, La Fille de Hakim
 1883, Les Épreuves de Norbert
 1883, Un oncle à héritage
 1884, Trois sous neufs (novel)
 1885, Mont Salvage
 1885, Mon ami et moi
 1885, Tante Marise
 1886, Trois contes de Noël
 1887, Rouzétou
 1888, Fils de veuve
 1888, La Pie au nid
 1888, La Pierre de touche
 1890, La Teppe aux merles
 1890, La Part du cadet
 1890, Le Bouquet d'algues
 1891, La Pièce de douze sous
 1892, Castelvert
 1893, Berthe la Frisonne. À l'aveuglette. Bec-d'Acier
 1893, Le Protégé d'Alice
 1894, Le Droit Chemin. Par la Traverse. La Veste du Colporteur
 1895, Au tournant du Chemin
 1897, Le Capitaine aux pieds nus
 1902, La Dame noire. Une Trouvaille. Sur la Pierre du souvenir
 1903, Le Siège de Calais
 1904, D'une rive à l'autre

References

Sources 
 Bibliothèque nationale de France (person authority record and bibliography) (in French)
 

1836 births
1925 deaths
19th-century French writers
19th-century French women writers
19th-century French translators
20th-century French writers
20th-century French women writers
20th-century French translators
People from Haute-Garonne
French feminists
French feminist writers